The concept of a victim soul is an unofficial belief derived from interpretations of the Catholic Church teachings on redemptive suffering. A person believes themselves or is considered by others to be chosen by God to suffer more than most, accepting this condition based on the example of Christ's own Passion. Neither the Catholic Church, nor any other Christian denomination, officially designates anyone as a victim soul. As it is not considered dogma, the Church classifies belief in victim souls as a matter of private revelation and thus not obligatory for members to subscribe to.

Background
Paul the Apostle may have considered himself an example, as he says in Colossians 1:24: "Now I rejoice in my sufferings for your sake, and in my flesh I complete what is lacking in Christ’s afflictions for the sake of his body, that is, the Church," (RSV; SCE)

In the apostolic letter Salvifici doloris (1984), which deals with human suffering and redemption, Pope John Paul II noted that: "The Redeemer suffered in place of man and for man. Every man has his own share in the Redemption. Each one is also called to share in that suffering through which the Redemption was accomplished. ..."

An exposition of the tradition of victim soul appears in the autobiography of the Carmelite monastic Thérèse of Lisieux, The Story of a Soul. In her personal view, the victim soul is a chosen one whose suffering is mysteriously joined with the redemptive suffering of Christ and is used for the redemption of others.

The Catholic Church does not officially designate anyone as a victim soul since the only victim soul the Church acknowledges is Jesus Christ himself. The issue came up when the family of an ailing child in a vegetative state, Audrey Santo. claimed that Audrey had volunteered to be a victim soul.  Rev. Daniel P. Reilly, Bishop of Worcester,  made clear that the Church does not acknowledge such claims.  The term comes from the testimony of those who have observed Christians who seem to or purport to undergo redemptive suffering. Victim soul status is a matter of private revelation unlike dogmas; therefore, individual believers are not required to accept, as part of the Catholic faith, the legitimacy of any particular person for whom such a claim is made, nor the genuineness of any miraculous claims that have been made in connection with such a person.

Notable cases
Examples of alleged victim souls are:
 Lidwina of Schiedam (1380 - 1433)
 Mary of the Divine Heart (1863 – 1899): the noble countess Droste zu Vischering and Mother Superior of the Convent of Good Shepherd Sisters in Porto, Portugal, wrote in her autobiography "I offered myself to God as a victim for the sanctification of priests" and added "I know that the Lord has accepted my suffering".
 Gemma Galgani (1878 – April 11, 1903): wrote in her autobiography how Jesus told her "I need souls who, by their sufferings, trials and sacrifices, make amends for sinners and for their ingratitude."
 Maria Valtorta (1897 – 1961): whose spiritual life was influenced by reading the autobiography of Thérèse of Lisieux, as well as the life of John Mary Vianney at the age of 28, before becoming bedridden, she offered herself to God as a victim soul.
 Alexandrina of Balazar (1904 – 1955): whose Vatican biography states that she saw her vocation in life to invite others to conversion, and to "offer a living witness of Christ's passion, contributing to the redemption of humanity."
 Faustina Kowalska (1905 – 1938): who wrote in her diary that Christ had chosen her to be a "victim offering", a role that she voluntarily accepted.
 Anneliese Michel (1952 – 1976): who is said to have suffered from demonic possession and underwent subsequent exorcisms; she is said to have been visited by the Blessed Virgin Mary who asked her "to be a victim soul who would show the German people and the world the devil does really exist."

Although the notion of a scapegoat has been present within Judeo-Christian teachings for long, the Catholic concept of a victim soul is distinct and different from it, in that in this case the victim soul willingly offers the suffering to God, unlike the unwitting scapegoat scenario.

See also
Redeemer (Christianity)
Stations of the Cross
Man of Sorrows
Our Lady of Seven Dolours
Pieta
Ecce Homo
Reparation to the Immaculate Heart of Mary
Persecution of Christians

References

Catholic spirituality